Grigore Gafencu (January 30, 1892 –  January 30, 1957) was a Romanian politician, diplomat and journalist.

Political career
Gafencu was born in Bârlad. He studied law and received his Ph.D. in law from the University of Bucharest. During World War I, he participated as a lieutenant and received the Mihai Viteazul Order for courage in battle. After the war, he became a journalist and founded the Timpul Familiei newspaper, which was translated in French and distributed in many countries. At the age of 32, he became a National Peasants' Party deputy in the Romanian Chamber of Deputies (lower house of the Romanian Parliament) and was the assistant of the Minister of Foreign Affairs during the Iuliu Maniu government of 1928.

In 1939, he became a Minister of Foreign Affairs. For the next two years, he tried to assure the neutrality of Romania, which was caught up between Germany and the Soviet Union. His efforts obtained guarantees from France and Great Britain, which were nevertheless not respected. After Northern Transylvania was annexed by Hungary as a result of the Second Vienna Award, and Bessarabia, Northern Bukovina, and the Hertsa region were annexed by the Soviet Union in 1940, he was sent as ambassador to Moscow, where he remained until the beginning of the war against the Soviet Union on 21 June 1941. He then settled in Geneva, Switzerland.

Exile
During World War II, he collaborated with the Tribune de Genève and other newspapers across Europe. In 1944, his book Préliminaires de la guerre à l'Est (Preliminaries of the War in the East) was published under the author name of Grégoire Gafenco by the Egloff publishing house in Fribourg. The book is still considered one of the best analyzes of Soviet-German relations in the run-up to the war.

After the war, Gafencu moved to Paris. He then published in 1946 his second book, Last Days of Europe (Derniers jours de l'Europe), in which he described his voyages across Europe in 1939 and 1940. In the preface he claimed that "the world made a war to kill zone's of influence and we must make a peace to kill them for a second time".

In 1947, he was invited by Yale University Press to the United States for a series of conferences; he then lectured at New York University. He began to form groups that would militate for a European Movement, a federation of European states in which Romania would be included. He participated at the founding of the Free Europe Committee and organized each Tuesday evening in his apartment on Park Avenue, New York City, a series of meetings called Tuesday Panels in which current events were discussed.

He was a member of the Romanian National Committee (1949–1952) and was one of the founders of the Free Romanian League. Gafencu was awarded Order of the White Eagle and other decorations. He died in 1957 of a heart attack at his home in Paris.

A street in Sector 1 of Bucharest is named after him.

Patrick Leigh Fermor described him as "one of the best-looking men I've ever seen, a person of enormous charm and courage".

Writings

References

External links
 

1892 births
1957 deaths
People from Bârlad
University of Bucharest alumni
Romanian military personnel of World War I
Romanian people of World War II
National Peasants' Party politicians
20th-century Romanian politicians
Members of the Chamber of Deputies (Romania)
Recipients of the Order of Michael the Brave
Politicians from Bucharest
Diplomats from Bucharest
Romanian Ministers of Foreign Affairs
Romanian newspaper editors
Romanian newspaper founders
Romanian exiles
Camarilla (Carol II of Romania)